is the 29th single by the Japanese J-pop group Every Little Thing, released on October 26, 2005.

Track listing
 (Words - Kaori Mochida / music - HIKARI)
 (Words - Kaori Mochida / music - tetsuhiko & Tomoji Sogawa)
Kimi no Te (instrumental)
Kaerimichi (instrumental)

Charts
Oricon Sales Chart (Japan)

External links
  information at Avex Network.
  information at Oricon.

2005 singles
Every Little Thing (band) songs
Songs written by Kaori Mochida
Avex Trax singles
2005 songs